Les Trois-Îlets is a town and commune in the French overseas department and region of Martinique.

It was the birthplace of Joséphine (1763–1814), who married Napoleon Bonaparte and became Empress of the French.

Population

See also
Communes of the Martinique department

References

External links

Tourism office 

Communes of Martinique
Populated places in Martinique